Superplasticizers (SPs), also known as high range water reducers, are additives used in making high strength concrete. Plasticizers are chemical compounds that enable the production of concrete with approximately 15% less water content. Superplasticizers allow reduction in water content by 30% or more. These additives are employed at the level of a few weight percent. Plasticizers and superplasticizers retard the curing of concrete.

Generally, superplasticizer can be classified into such types:purified lignosulfonates, carboxylate synthetic polymers, sulfonated synthetic polymers and synthetic polymers with mixed functionality cementitious materials.

SPs are used where well-dispersed particle suspension is required to improve the flow characteristics (rheology) of suspensions such as in concrete applications. Their addition to concrete or mortar allows the reduction of the water to cement ratio without negatively affecting the workability of the mixture, and enables the production of self-consolidating concrete and high performance concrete. They greatly improve the performance of the hardening fresh paste. The strength of concrete increases when the water to cement ratio decreases.

The addition of SP in the truck during transit is a fairly modern development within the industry. Admixtures added in transit through automated slump management systems, such as Verifi, allow concrete producers to maintain slump until discharge without reducing concrete quality.

Mechanism

Traditional plasticizers are lignosulphonates as their sodium salt.  Superplasticizers are synthetic polymers.   Compounds used as superplasticizers include sulfonated naphthalene formaldehyde condensate, sulfonated melamine formaldehyde condensate, acetone formaldehyde condensate and polycarboxylate ethers.  Cross-linked melamine- or naphthalene-sulfonates, referred to as PMS (polymelamine sulfonate) and PNS (polynaphthalene sulfonate), respectively, are illustrative.  They are prepared by crosslinking of the sulfonated monomers using formaldehyde or by sulfonating the corresponding crosslinked polymer.

The polymers that serve as plasticizers exhibit surfactant properties.  They are often ionomers.  They function as dispersants to minimize particle segregation (gravel, coarse and fine sands).  The negatively charged polymer backbone adsorbs on the positively charged colloidal particles.  However, engineers do not fully understand their working mechanisms, resulting, in certain cases, cement-superplasticizer incompatibilities.

See also
 Particle aggregation (inverse process of)
 Peptization
 Plasticizer
 Rheology
 Surfactant
 Suspension (chemistry)

References

Cement
Concrete
Chemistry
Colloidal chemistry
Heterogeneous chemical mixtures
Concrete admixtures